The West Bromwich Friendly Societies Charity Cup, better known as the West Bromwich Charity Cup, was a football competition for teams from the West Midlands region, though at least one team from outside the area (Everton) also participated.

In three medals awarded to West Bromwich Albion reserve player Stan Amos, including his 1924 West Bromwich FSCC winner's 9-carrat gold medal, were sold at auction.

Winners

Footnotes

References

Defunct football cup competitions in England
West Bromwich